Thomas Wade may refer to:
Thomas Wade
 Thomas Wade, a fictional officer, industrial leader and Swordholder contender in Liu Cixin's Death's End (2010).
 Thomas Wade (Methodist), Irish Methodist
 Thomas Wade (North Carolina politician) (1720–1786), Revolutionary War officer and politician from North Carolina
 Thomas Wade (singer) (born 1961), Canadian country music artist
 Thomas Wade (writer) (1805–1875), English poet and dramatist
 Thomas Francis Wade (1818–1895), British diplomat and Sinologist
 Thomas James Wade (1893–1969), Roman Catholic bishop
 Thomas M. Wade (1860–1929), educator, politician, and civic leader from Louisiana
Tom Wade
 Tom Wade (footballer) (1909–?), English footballer
 Tom Wade (cricketer) (1910–1987), English cricketer
Tommy Wade
 Tommy Wade (born 1942), American football player
 Tommy Wade (Australian footballer) (1894–1939), Australian rules footballer